Always is the fourteenth solo studio album by American contemporary Christian singer Chris Tomlin. It was released on September 9, 2022, through Sparrow Records and Capitol CMG. The album features guest appearances by Elevation Worship, Steffany Gretzinger, and Brandon Lake. The album was produced by Ben Glover, Jeff Sojka, Ed Cash, Jonathan Smith, Dave Haywood, Ben West, and Bryan Fowler.

The album was supported by the release of "I See You," "Always," "Yahweh (No One)" and "Holy Forever" as singles. "I See You" peaked at No. 31 on the US Hot Christian Songs chart. The title track peaked at No. 6 on the Hot Christian Songs chart. "Yahweh (No One)" peaked at No. 46 on the US Christian Airplay chart. "Holy Forever" peaked at No. 26 on the Hot Christian Songs chart. "O Lord, You're Beautiful" was released as promotional singles. The album was being promoted with the Tomlin United Tour and the Stories of Worship Tour, spanning cities across the United States.

Always drew mixed reactions from critics, and it was a commercially successful album upon its release, debuting at No. 2 on Billboard's Top Christian Albums Chart in the United States, and at No. 11 on the Official Charts' Official Christian & Gospel Albums Chart in the United Kingdom. The album received a nomination for the Grammy Award for Best Contemporary Christian Music Album at the 2023 Grammy Awards, while the song "Holy Forever" was nominated for Best Contemporary Christian Music Performance/Song.

Background
On July 15, 2022, Chris Tomlin announced that he will be releasing a new worship project titled Always, revealing the album cover, track listing and artists featured on the album. The album marks the follow-up to Tomlin's previous release, Chris Tomlin & Friends (2021), and the companion EP, Chris Tomlin & Friends: Summer EP (2021). The album contains 13 tracks, with twelve being co-written by Tomlin, with Elevation Worship, Steffany Gretzinger, and Brandon Lake featuring as guests. Tomlin shared the purpose of the album in an interview with Forbes, saying, "This record is back to the center, the heart of what this is all about for me – really helping people connect to God and worship God." 

The quality time that Tomlin spent with his family inspired some songs on the album, from working on previously written material, covering classics and recording new material. The inspiration for the album emerging when Tomlin rediscovered "Oh Lord, You're Beautiful" by Keith Green, which was one of his favorite songs growing up. During the COVID pandemic, Tomlin taught the song to his daughters, singing it regularly during home church on Sundays and realizing that he wanted to record it.

Release and promotion

Singles
On August 6, 2021, Chris Tomlin released "I See You" with Brandon Lake as the lead single from the album, accompanied with the song's lyric video. The song peaked at No. 31 on the US Hot Christian Songs chart.

On March 29, 2022, Tomlin released a two-track single titled Always, containing the title track and "Yahweh (No One)" with Elevation Worship, accompanied with their lyric videos. "Always" peaked at No. 6 on the Hot Christian Songs chart. "Yahweh (No One)" peaked at No. 46 on the US Christian Airplay chart.

"Holy Forever" impact Christian radio in the United States on March 10, 2023, as the fourth single from the album. "Holy Forever" peaked at No. 26 on the Hot Christian Songs chart. It was nominated for the Grammy Award for Best Contemporary Christian Music Performance/Song at the 2023 Grammy Awards.

Promotional singles
On July 15, 2022, Chris Tomlin released "Holy Forever" as the first promotional single from the album, accompanied with its lyric video.

On August 12, 2022, Chris Tomlin released "O Lord, You're Beautiful" as the second and final promotional single from the album, accompanied with its lyric video.

Performances
On October 10, 2022, Chris Tomlin performed "Holy Forever" on The Kelly Clarkson Show.

Touring
On October 15, 2021, Premier Productions announced that Chris Tomlin and Hillsong United will embark on a co-headline tour dubbed the Tomlin United Tour, slated to commence at the Greensboro Coliseum in Greensboro, North Carolina, on February 9, 2022, concluding at the Gas South Arena in Duluth, Georgia. On February 9, 2022, Premier Productions and The Tomlin United Tour announced that the tour will be postponed, beginning on March 29 at Pechanga Arena in San Diego, California, and ending on June 17 at the Van Andel Arena in Grand Rapids, Michigan. The tour was a success, having ranked in Pollstar'''s Top 10 Worldwide Tours list during its run.

In November 2022, Chris Tomlin announced the Stories of Worship Tour slated to commence on February 23, 2023, in San Antonio, Texas, and concluding on April 23, 2023, in Grand Rapids, Michigan.

Reception
Critical response

Jonathan Andre in his 365 Days of Inspiring Media review opined that "Chris will always be polarising. They'll be people who love his music, and then they’ll be people who’ll think he’s 'basic'. I fall in the middle, some albums I absolutely love, and then there’s others, where I appreciate the album from an objective standpoint, but I myself can’t connect to it as much as others," with his opinion on most of the songs on the album being the latter. Timothy Yap of JubileeCast gave a glowing review of the album, saying, "Chris Tomlin has returned to what's he done best: writing and singing powerful worship anthems for the church. After a detour into a country-pop duet album which finds him falling into too many crevices, Always is a return to form. If you like Tomlin for his powerhouse singalongs such as "Whom Shall I Fear (God of Angel Armies)," "Our God," and "Good Good Father," you'll love what he has to offer here." In a NewReleaseToday review, Jasmin Patterson spoke of the album, saying "What I love about Chris Tomlin is that he's consistent. When you listen to a Chris Tomlin album, you know what you're going to get: songs that are accessible for anyone to play and sing along with pure worship, and the truth of who God is. True to Chris' mission in ministry, Always will point your heart to God in adoration." Celita Diaz-Perillo, indicated in a three-point-eight star review at Today's Christian Entertainment: "Always has a mixture of new tunes, and classic songs with some creative changes. Some of them call the soul to ardent, active faith. Some are gentle reminders of who we are in Christ. All are intended to spur the believing soul to persevere and hold on and look up to the Helper and Lover of our souls." Gerod Bass of Worship Musician magazine wrote a positive review of the album, saying "This is the best Tomlin album since Never Lose Sight with almost every song sure to be a Sunday morning classic. Seriously, there is not a bad song or one I would consider a "filler" here. The church is better with this version of Chris Tomlin and I for one am thankful to have him back doing what he does best."

Accolades

Commercial performance
In the United States, Always debuted at No. 2 on the Top Christian Albums chart in the United States dated September 24, 2022. Always'' launched at No. 11 on the OCC's Official Christian & Gospel Albums Chart in the United Kingdom, in the week ending September 22, 2022.

Track listing

Personnel
Adapted from AllMusic.

 David Angell — strings
 Monisa Angell — strings
 Jacob Arnold — drums, percussion
 Adam Ayan — mastering engineer
 Carrie Bailey — strings
 Jonsal Barrientes — choir/chorus
 Kevin Bates — cello
 Dallan Beck — editing
 Jenny Bifano — strings
 Jesse Brock — mixing assistant
 Chris Brown — background vocals, choir/chorus
 Luke Brown — background vocals
 Shantay Brown — choir/chorus
 Daniel Carson — acoustic guitar, choir/chorus, electric guitar, recording
 Ed Cash — acoustic guitar, electric guitar, keyboards, producer, programming
 Tamera Chipp — choir/chorus
 Chad Chrisman — A&R
 Court Clement — 12 string acoustic guitar, acoustic guitar, electric guitar, mandolin
 Nickie Conley — background vocals, choir/chorus
 Janet Darnall — strings
 David Davidson — strings
 Elevation Worship — primary artist
 Enaka Enyong — choir/chorus
 Jason Eskridge — background vocals, choir/chorus
 Bryan Fowler — acoustic guitar, background vocals, bass, electric guitar, keyboards, producer, programmer, synthesizer programming
 Devonne Fowlkes — choir/chorus
 Sam Gibson — mixing
 Ben Glover — acoustic guitar, background vocals, bass, choir/chorus, electric guitar, engineer, guitar, keyboards, mixing, producer, programming, recording
 Lindsay Glover — choir/chorus
 Steffany Gretzinger — primary artist
 Dave Haywood — acoustic guitar, background vocals, bouzouki, electric guitar, keyboards, percussion, producer, strings, vocal engineer
 Tarik Henry — choir/chorus
 Mark Hill — bass
 Tiffany Hudson — choir/chorus
 Tommy Iceland — choir/chorus
 Jenn Johnson — background vocals
 Taylor Johnson — acoustic guitar, electric guitar
 Charles Kelley — background vocals
 Daewoo Kim — recording
 Graham King — engineer, recording
 Benji Kuriakose — choir/chorus
 Benji Kurokose — choir/chorus
 Brandon Lake — primary artist, vocals
 Jacob Lowery — bass
 Brett Mabury — arranger
 Paul Mabury — drums
 Jerry McPherson — electric guitar, guitar
 Matthew Melton — bass
 Wil Merrell — choir/chorus
 Buckley Miller — recording
 Sean Moffitt — mixing
 Gordon Mote — piano
 Craig Nelson — strings
 Emily Nelson — strings
 Paul Nelson — strings
 Brad O'Donnell — A&R
 Kiley Phillips — choir/chorus
 Randy Poole — recording
 Colton Price — editing, programming
 David Ramirez — programming
 Hillary Scott — background vocals
 Sophie Shear — choir/chorus
 Jonathan Smith — background vocals, Hammond B3, organ, piano, producer, programming
 Jeff Sojka — background vocals, choir/chorus, drums, electric guitar, engineer, keyboards, producer, programming, recording
 Aaron Sterling — drums, percussion
 Isaiah Templeton — choir/chorus
 Chris Tomlin — choir/chorus, primary artist, vocals
 Bria Valderrama — choir/chorus
 Doug Weier — mixing
 Jordan Welch — choir/chorus
 Ben West — acoustic guitar, bass, drum programming, electric guitar, keyboards, producer
 Kris Wilkinson — strings
 Joe Williams — programming
 Karen Winkelmann — strings

Charts

Release history

References

External links
 

2022 albums
Chris Tomlin albums
Sparrow Records albums